Hesitation Wounds is the third studio album by American hip hop artist Sleep, a member of the Pacific Northwest hip hop collective Oldominion. It was released on Strange Famous Records on June 29, 2009.

Music 
The album features production by Zavala, Reanimator, Samix, Secondson, Pale Soul of Oldominion and Smoke M2D6 of Oldominion. Guest appearances include Del The Funky Homosapien, DJ Zone, Grayskul, and Toni Hill of Oldominion.

Track listing

Personnel 
 Contributing artists
 Horns – Ross Liquid (tracks 2 and 5)
 Horns – Jamzels and Lambs Bread (track 5)
 Scratches – DJ Zone (tracks 2, 5, 6, 10, 11 and 12)
 Vocals – Toni Hill (tracks 2, 5, 7 and 12)
 Scott Preston (track 5)
 Production
 Mastering, recording – Zebulon Dak 
 Artwork – Coro 36

References

External links 
 Hesitation Wounds at Discogs (list of releases)
 Sleep at Strange Famous Records

Sleep (rapper) albums
Strange Famous Records albums
2009 albums